Dalgaard is a Danish surname. Notable people with the surname include:

Eluf Dalgaard (1929–2004), Danish cyclist 
Peter Dalgaard (born 1959), Danish statistician
Sebastian Dalgaard (born 1991), Danish football player
Thomas Dalgaard (born 1984), Danish former football player

Danish-language surnames